Hamm-Heessen station is a passenger station in Heessen, a suburb of the Westphalian city of Hamm in the German state of North Rhine-Westphalia. It lies on the Hamm–Minden railway, one of the most heavily trafficked lines in Germany. It has an hourly Regional-Express service, the Rhein-Weser-Express (RE 6) on the Düsseldorf–Dortmund–Bielefeld–Minden route as well as an hourly Regionalbahn service, the Ems-Börde-Bahn (RB 69) on the Münster)–Hamm–Bielefeld route, so there is a service about every half an hour. Both lines were previously operated by DB Regio NRW. In December 2008, eurobahn, based in Hamm, took over the operation of RB 69.

In 2009, about €600,000 were allocated for the rehabilitation of the station.

Services

In passenger transport the station is served by several Regional-Express and Regionalbahn services:

References

Railway stations in North Rhine-Westphalia
Railway stations in Germany opened in 1891
Buildings and structures in Schaumburg